Khudnapur is a village in Mehkar taluka of Buldhana district of Maharashtra.  It is a part of Thar-Bardapur Gat Grampanchayat. The village had a population of 118 as per census 2011.

Shri. Vijay Mohrut is Sarpanch of the village in 2019.

Buldhana district